During the 2017–18 FC Twente season, the club will participate in the Eredivisie and the KNVB Cup. It will be 53rd season in the history of the club and the 34th consecutive season in the top flight of the Dutch football.

Season review

June
On 1 June, the club confirmed the signing of Alexander Laukart.

On 12 June, Twente and Nick Hengelman negotiated a two-year contract extension lasting until 30 June 2019.

Squad

New contracts

Last updated: 11 September 2017

Transfers

In

Summer

Winter

Out

Summer

Winter

Last updated: 18 February 2018

Non-competitive

Friendlies

Last updated: 21 March 2018

Competitions

Eredivisie

League matches

KNVB Cup

Last updated: 28 February 2018

Statistics

Appearances

Last updated: 29 April 2018

Goalscorers

References

FC Twente seasons
Twente